Marc J. Melitz (born January 1, 1968) is an American economist. He is currently a professor of economics at Harvard University.

Melitz has published a number of highly cited articles in the area of international economics and international trade, most notably "The Impact of Trade on Intra-Industry Reallocations and Aggregate Industry Productivity" in Econometrica which explores the effects of international trade on the competition within domestic industries.

In addition to his Harvard position, Melitz is also a research fellow of the Centre for Economic Policy Research and a research associate of the National Bureau of Economic Research since 2000. Before joining Harvard, Melitz was a professor at Princeton University.

Melitz holds a  BA in Mathematics from Haverford College (1989), an MSBA in Operations Research from the University of Maryland, College Park (1992) a M.A.(1997), and a Ph.D. (2000) in Economics from the University of Michigan.

In 2008, The Economist listed Melitz as one of the top 8 young economists in the world.

Footnotes

External links
Official web site at Harvard
Academic CV

1968 births
Trade economists
Harvard University faculty
Princeton University faculty
Haverford College alumni
University of Maryland, College Park alumni
University of Michigan alumni
Living people
Fellows of the Econometric Society
20th-century American economists
21st-century American economists